Yekaterina Ivanovna Nelidova (1756–1839) was a Russian Empire noblewoman and lady-in-waiting. She was the royal mistress of Tsar Paul I of Russia.

Nelidova graduated from the Smolny Institute in 1776 and became a lady-in-waiting, first to Grand Duchess Natalya and then to Grand Duchess Maria alongside her friend and fellow graduate Natalya Borshchova. She had a relationship with Grand Duke Paul, the future monarch, and acted as a successful mediator between him and people he was in conflict with. Nelidova was also noted for her dramatic talents, which endeared her to the crown prince, who liked to stage operas with the participation of people he was close with.

There are sources that refer to her as "Little Monster", a description attributed to Catherine on account of Nelidova's physical appearance. Nevertheless, she was an important courtier and her position also led to her relatives' acquiring positions at court. Paul's defense of Nelidova was even documented amid issues of social conformity at Catherine the Great's court.  She left her position at court in 1798.

References

 Дмитрий Григорьевич Левицкий 1735—1822: Каталог временной выставки — Государственный русский музей. — Л.: Искусство, Ленинградское отделение, 1987. — 142 с.
 Шумигорский Е. С. Екатерина Ивановна Нелидова. Очерк из истории императора Павла. — М.:  Захаров, 2008. .

External link

1756 births
1839 deaths
18th-century people from the Russian Empire
19th-century people from the Russian Empire
18th-century women from the Russian Empire
19th-century women from the Russian Empire
Mistresses of Paul of Russia
Ladies-in-waiting from the Russian Empire